Te Puke Te Ao (1834 – 28 October 1886) was a 19th-century Māori member of the House of Representatives.

Te Ao was a chief of the Ngāti Raukawa tribe. Early in his life, he was converted by missionaries. Te Ao was a sheep farmer at Ōtaki on the Kapiti Coast.

He represented the Western Maori electorate from 1884 when he defeated Wiremu Te Wheoro, to 1886 when he died.

References

1834 births
1886 deaths
New Zealand MPs for Māori electorates
Members of the New Zealand House of Representatives
People from Ōtaki, New Zealand
19th-century New Zealand politicians